Corona-chan is a  anthropomorphization of the coronavirus which became a popular meme on 4chan, Reddit and other websites during the ongoing COVID-19 pandemic.

In mid-January 2020, 4chan users created the Corona-chan character as a girl with bat wings and green eyes wearing a red cheongsam, an item of traditional Chinese clothing, with thorny spheres for hair buns, symbolizing the virus. In some representations, she holds the flag of China and hands out bat soup. These features reference the popular bat soup and Wuhan lab theories for the origin of the virus. Her Chinese appearance may have also promoted xenophobia and racism related to the pandemic. On 4chan, a user made a thread titled “All hail, Peng Zhou, creator of Corona-Chan”, linking to an article by Zero Hedge, claiming that the new coronavirus may have been created by the Wuhan Institute of Virology, at the Chinese Academy of Sciences. As a pun, she was also often represented holding or drinking a Corona beer.

The subreddit "r/coronachan", which features illustrations of the character, had 2,000 subscriptions by 2020. There are Corona-chan galleries on the Internet. Lushsux created a wall graffiti showing the coronavirus Corona-chan standing behind a mask-wearing PewDiePie.

Moe anthropomorphism had been applied to diseases online before: during the Ebola virus outbreak of West Africa in 2014, the character of Ebola-chan was already circulating on image boards and online discussion forums in the English-speaking world.

Reactions
Samantha Cole of Vice Media believes that the character is Chinese at first sight, which is racially offensive, but it can also make people relax a little in the continuous negative news.

Some non-Chinese women who cosplayed Corona-chan and posted photos on the Internet were criticized by Chinese users and eventually apologized. The women said the behavior was not meant to insult or discriminate against others, but to inform the public about the importance of washing hands to prevent infectious diseases. There are also netizens who support her activities and criticize Chinese users who asked the women to apologize for being naive, believing that they are not at fault. On March 20, 2020, Chinese-American cosplayer Yaya Han said compared cosplaying Corona-chan to cosplaying Nazis, an unacceptable behavior, and warned other cosplayers to be cautious.

 worried that this meme would inflame racism against Chinese or Asians, and he points out that some Corona-chan works better avoid this, such as Ken Ashcorp's "Komm Süsser Tod" video, in which Corona-chan is depicted as a vampire rather than as a woman in a Chinese dress.

According to the Federal Protection Service report, some violent white supremacist radicals referred to the new coronavirus as Corona-chan while discussing the use of COVID-19 as a biological weapon.

See also

 Ebola-chan, an earlier moe anthropomorphization of a disease

References

Internet memes related to the COVID-19 pandemic
Moe anthropomorphism